The 1986–87 Yugoslav First Basketball League season was the 43rd season of the Yugoslav First Basketball League, the highest professional basketball league in SFR Yugoslavia.

Regular season

Classification

Playoff 
Only the top four placed league table teams qualified for the playoffs quarterfinal automatically.

Teams placed fifth, sixth, seventh, eighth, ninth, and tenth were joined by the top two Second League teams for an 8-team play-in round. The winner of each best-of-three series advanced to the playoffs quarterfinal round.

The winning roster of Partizan:
  Vlade Divac
  Žarko Paspalj
  Goran Grbović
  Aleksandar Đorđević
  Milenko Savović
  Želimir Obradović
  Ivo Nakić
  Slaviša Koprivica
  Savo Stefanović
  Obrad Ignjatović
  Vladimir Dragutinović
  Dejan Lakićević
  Slobodan Kanjevac
  Boris Orcev

Coach:  Duško Vujošević

Scoring leaders
 Dražen Petrović (Cibona) - ___ points (37.1ppg)

Qualification in 1987–88 season European competitions 

FIBA European Champions Cup
 Partizan (champions)

FIBA Cup Winners' Cup
 IMT (Cup winners)

FIBA Korać Cup
 Cibona (1st)
 Jugoplastika (3rd)
 Crvena Zvezda (4th)
 Šibenka (5th)

References

Yugoslav First Basketball League seasons
 
Yugoslav